Michela Cupido (born 2 May 1978) is an Italian former footballer who played as a goalkeeper for ACF Milan.

International career
Michela Cupido was also part of the Italian team at the 2005 European Championships. Cupido made her debut for Italy in 2009 for the Azzuri.

References

External links

1978 births
Living people
Women's association football goalkeepers
Italian women's footballers
Italy women's international footballers
Serie A (women's football) players
ACF Milan players
Torres Calcio Femminile players